1 Corps ("First Corps") is a field corps formation of the Sri Lanka Army. The Corps is headquartered at Kilinochchi in Northern Province. It was raised on 17 October 2021. It was formed with the amalgamation of the Reserve Strike Force, special forces units and the former Security Forces Headquarters - Kilinochchi (SFHQ-KLN) creating the Army's First Strike Corps.

Units 
Reserve Strike Force
53 Division, based at Inamaluwa, Dambulla
 Air Mobile Brigade
 532 Brigade
 533 Brigade
58 Division
 581 Brigade
 582 Brigade
 583 Brigade
Special Operations Force
 Commando Brigade 
 1 Commando 
 2 Commando 
 3 Commando 
 4 Commando 
 Special Forces Brigade  
 1 Special Forces 
 2 Special Forces 
 3 Special Forces 
 4 Special Forces
 Affiliated Units 
 8th Medium Regiment, Sri Lanka Artillery
 B Sqd, 5th Reconnaissance Regiment, Sri Lanka Armoured Corps
 9 Sri Lanka Signals Corps
 Combat Support Services
 Forward Maintenance Area (FMA), Kilinochchi 
 Logistic Battalions
 5 Sri Lanka Corps of Military Police
 6 Sri Lanka Army Ordnance Corps
 7 Sri Lanka Army Service Corps
 7 Sri Lanka Electrical and Mechanical Engineers
 11 Engineer Services Regiment
 Army Base Hospital, Kilinochchi

References 

Military units and formations established in 2021
001